Bruceville-Eddy High School is a public high school located in Bruceville-Eddy, Texas that serves about 200 students in grades 9-12 and classified as a 2A school by the UIL.   The High School is part of the Bruceville-Eddy Independent School District which covers southern McLennan County, Texas.   In 2013, the school was rated "Met Standard" by the Texas Education Agency.

Athletics
The Bruceville-Eddy Eagles compete in:

Baseball
Basketball
Cross Country
Football
Golf
Powerlifting
Softball
Tennis
Track and Field
Volleyball

References

External links
Bruceville-Eddy ISD website

Schools in McLennan County, Texas
Public high schools in Texas